Planić is a Serbian family name derived from unattested male name Plano or female name Plana.

Notable people with Planić surname include:
 Bogdan Planić - (born 1992) a Serbian professional footballer
 Petar Planić - (born 1989) a Serbian football defender 
 Stjepan Planić - (1900–1980) a Croatian architect

References 

Serbian surnames